The Infant Hercules is the second demo album by the English progressive rock band, Big Big Train. It was released in 1993.

The name is likely a reference to the quote by William Gladstone, “This remarkable place, the youngest child of England’s enterprise, is an infant, but if an infant, an infant Hercules,” used to describe the English town of Middlesbrough.

Track listing

CD
 "Far Distant Thing" - 4.34
 "Dismounting Tigers" - 4.36
 "Lincoln Green" - 3.50
 "Show of Strength" - 4.54
 "Red Five" - 5.12
 "Sky End Fall" - 5.23
 "Kingmaker" - 9.25

Tape
 "Dismounting Tigers"
 "Show of Strength"
 "Lincoln Green"
 "Red Five"
 "Far Distant Thing"
 "Sky End Fall"
 "Kingmaker"

Personnel
Ian Cooper - keyboards
Steve Hughes - drums
Andy Poole - bass
Martin Read - vocals
Greg Spawton - guitar

References

Big Big Train albums
1993 albums
Demo albums